John William "Crutchy" Morrison (March 4, 1895 - March 14, 1956) was a Canadian professional ice hockey player who played 18 games in the National Hockey League during the 1925–26 season with the New York Americans. The rest of his career, which lasted from 1913 to 1932, was spent in a variety of other leagues, including the Western Canada Hockey League, where he played for the Edmonton Eskimos. With Edmonton he played in the 1923 Stanley Cup Final, and scored the team's only goal.

Playing career
Born in Selkirk, Manitoba, Morrison played senior hockey for the Selkirk Fishermen, starting in 1913. In 1915, he enlisted with the Canadian Expeditionary Force for the First World War. Before being sent overseas, he played one season for the Winnipeg 61st Battalion to capture the Allan Cup in 1916. After his tour of duty ended in 1919, he played two more seasons of senior hockey, with Selkirk in 1919–20 and the Winnipeg Falcons for 1920–21.

Morrison joined the Edmonton Eskimos of the WCHL in 1921, and played four seasons with the club. In 1923, the Eskimos won the WCHL title and took on the defending Stanley Cup champion Ottawa Senators in Vancouver in a best-of-three series. The Eskimos were stymied by the Senators six-man defense and Morrison scored the team's only goal, in the first game. He was picked up by the New York Americans in a trade from Edmonton for the 1925–26 season and he played in 18 NHL games without any goals or points. He joined the Regina Capitals for the 1926–27 season, then played six seasons in the American Hockey Association for various teams, including the Duluth Hornets, for whom he played in his final season in 1931–32.

Career statistics

Regular season and playoffs

Awards and achievements
 Allan Cup Championship (1916)
 Honoured Member of the Manitoba Hockey Hall of Fame

External links

1895 births
1956 deaths
Buffalo Majors players
Canadian ice hockey right wingers
Canadian military personnel of World War I
Duluth Hornets players
Edmonton Eskimos (ice hockey) players
Ice hockey people from Manitoba
New York Americans players
St. Paul Saints (AHA) players
Sportspeople from Selkirk, Manitoba
Winnipeg Falcons players